Atomic Energy Research Establishment School & College, former name A. E. R. E High School, is a school in Savar Upazila, Dhaka, Bangladesh.

History 
It was established as a high school for the children of employees residing at Atomic Energy Research Establishment (AERE) campus and also the children from surrounding areas in 1983. After 2008 it has been enlarged as a college which has been named as Atomic Energy Research Establishment School and College. It is a part of AERE, under Bangladesh Atomic Energy Commission. It is maintained by a governing body headed by the DG of AERE. Now there are more than 1,600 students in various classes, more than 37 teachers and 13 office stuffs are working there.

References

Schools in Dhaka District
Colleges in Dhaka District
Educational institutions established in 1983
1983 establishments in Bangladesh